The 2017–18 Hampton Pirates men's basketball team represented Hampton University during the 2017–18 NCAA Division I men's basketball season. The Pirates, led by ninth-year head coach Edward Joyner, played their home games at the Hampton Convocation Center in Hampton, Virginia as members of the Mid-Eastern Athletic Conference. They finished the season 19–16, 12–4 in MEAC play to finish in a three-way tie for the MEAC Regular season championship. After tiebreakers, they received the No. 1 seed in the MEAC tournament where they Florida A&M and North Carolina A&T to advance to the championship game where they lost to North Carolina Central. As a regular season conference champion, and No. 1 seed in their conference tournament, who failed to win their conference tournament, they received an automatic bid to the National Invitation Tournament where they lost in the first round to Notre Dame.

This season was the Pirates' final season as members of the MEAC, as the school announced on November 16, 2017 that they will join the Big South Conference for the 2018–19 season.

Previous season
The Pirates finished the 2016–17 season 14–17, 11–5 in MEAC play to finish in a tie for third place. They lost in the quarterfinals of the MEAC tournament to Maryland Eastern Shore. They were invited to the College Basketball Invitational where they lost in the first round to Coastal Carolina.

Preseason 
The Pirates were picked to finish fourth in the MEAC in a preseason poll of coaches and sports information directors. Sophomore guard Jermaine Morrow was named to the preseason All-MEAC second team.

Roster

Accolades
Preseason All MEAC 2nd Team
 Jermaine Marrow

MEAC Player of the Week
 Jermaine Marrow (Nov 27)

MEAC Defensive Player of the Week 
 Trevond Barnes (Dec 11)

Schedule and results

|-
!colspan=9 style=| Exhibition

|-
!colspan=9 style=| Non-conference regular season

|-
!colspan=9 style=| MEAC regular season

|-
!colspan=9 style=| MEAC tournament

|-
!colspan=9 style=| NIT

References

Hampton Pirates men's basketball seasons
Hampton
Hampton Pirates
Hampton Pirates
Hampton